Problepsis borneamagna is a moth of the family Geometridae. It is found on Sabah and Borneo. The habitat consists of montane forests.

The wingspan is 17–19 mm.

References

Moths described in 1997
Scopulini
Moths of Asia